Henry James Johnson OBE, TD (1924–2008) was a Colonel in the British Army. He commanded the 21 SAS (TA), after which he led Britain's clandestine war against Egyptian forces in Yemen during the mid-1960s. After that he set up Britain's first post-war private military company.

Early life
Johnson was born 21 December 1924 then educated at Westminster School and was there at the same time as Tony Benn.

Military career
He joined the British Army and was commissioned as a second lieutenant in the Welsh Guards on 21 November 1943.

Johnson relinquished his military commission on 8 June 1948 to join the Territorial Army SAS as a trooper. He was then promoted back to lieutenant on 19 October 1948, with seniority from 21 December 1947. He was made an acting captain on 1 June 1950, which was confirmed on 21 December 1951, with seniority from 1 June 1950. He was made an acting major on 15 March 1953, and reverted to the rank of captain on 15 June 1954. He then received a series of promotions, which eventually led to the rank of Colonel. He was appointed as Aide-de-Camp to Queen Elizabeth II on 18 October 1969, which he held until 18 October 1974.

Johnson died 20 July 2008.

Awards and decorations

References

External links
Telegraph obituary of Colonel Jim Johnson

1924 births
2008 deaths
British Army personnel of World War II
Officers of the Order of the British Empire
People educated at Westminster School, London
Special Air Service officers
Welsh Guards officers